MasterChef Israel is an Israeli reality cooking competition show that debuted on 14 October 2010 by Keshet on Channel 2 (from 2017 Keshet 12). It is based on the global MasterChef competitive cooking show television format. The show was very well received and highly acclaimed, achieving excellent reviews and high ratings.

Format 
The premise of the show is a cooking competition between amateur cooks, competing for the title of "MasterChef" and a kitchen renovation. The first few episodes of every series are audition episodes where contestants cook to a panel of judges who decide based on a dish cooked in front of them whether or not to pass the contestant to the next level, where a large number of the contestants chosen in the auditions are eliminated through a series of tests, until 12–14 are chosen as the show's final cast, and the members of the season's "Nivheret" (Selected Team).

The members of the "Nivheret" compete in different challenges every episodes, such as the mystery Box Challenge, the Invention Test, Dish Recreation Challenges and Taste Challenges.

Mystery Box Challenge 
In the Mystery Box Challenge contestants receive a number of ingredients of which they are to make a dish of their choice. The contestants are allowed to use any number of the ingredients they are given as they wish, and are free to leave out any ingredients.

The Invention Test 
The Invention Test requires of the contestants to make a dish, usually with a certain requirement, such as that the dish should cost no more than a certain price, the dish should contain a certain ingredient or be an adaption of other dishes. The Invention Test is usually the challenge that leads to eliminations.

Dish Recreation Test 
In the Dish Recreation Test contestants are asked to recreate a complex dish made by a guest chef, usually with a recipe at hand.

Taste Challenges 
In Taste Challenges the contestants are given a dish to taste, and are asked to name ingredients in the dish, for every ingredient they name correctly they score a point, until their first mistake. The contestant with the lowest score is usually eliminated.

Judges 
The first season judges were Haim Cohen, Eyal Shani, Michal Ansky, and Rafi Adar, all successful restaurateurs in Israel.

After the first season was concluded, Eyal Shani became famous, due to his eccentric treatment of food as poetry in the show, though Haim Cohen was the most famous of the judges, Shani became the symbol of the show and became a cultural icon in Israel.

In the second season, Haim Cohen, Eyal Shani and Michal Ansky continued as judges with Yonatan Roshfeld, chef of the Herbert Samuel restaurant, brought in to replace Rafi Adar.

In the seventh season, Haim Cohen, Eyal Shani and Michal Ansky continued as judges with Israel Aharoni, a famous Israeli chef, brought in to replace Yonatan Roshfeld.

In the tenth season, Ruti Broudo was added as a fifth judge alongside the existing panel of judges in which Ansky continued while being pregnant during filimg.

Season 1 (2010) 
First aired on 14 October 2010, the first season of MasterChef received very high ratings and resulted in a large cook book that held all of the recipes shown on the first season.

Contestants

Elimination table

Season 2 (2011) 
The show was picked up for a second season in November 2010, a month after the first season first aired. the show began airing in June 2011, with the new judge, Yonatan Roshfeld.

Contestants

Junior MasterChef (2012)
Junior MasterChef Israel premiered on 20 April 2012 the judges will be the same as MasterChef Israel.

Contestants

Season 3 (2012–13)

Contestants

Season 4 (2014)

Contestants

MasterChef VIP (2015)

Contestants

Season 5 (2015)

Contestants

Season 6 (2016)

Contestants

Season 7 (2017–18)

Contestants

Season 8 (2019)

Contestants

VIP Special

Season 9 (2021)

Contestants

VIP Special 1

VIP Special 2

Season 10 (2022) 
Season 10 began on 15 June 2022,  Ruti Broudo joined as a fifth judge.

During the season Eyal Shani was criticized after he discriminated against a contestant who lives in Bat Ayin based on his residence. Critics called for Shani's removal from the show.

Contestants

VIP Special

See also
Israeli television
Israeli cuisine

References

External links 
 MasterChef's page on Keshet's website (Hebrew)

Israel
Channel 2 (Israeli TV channel) original programming
2010 Israeli television series debuts
Israeli reality television series
Israeli television series based on British television series
Channel 12 (Israel) original programming